John Edward Hayes  (1855–1904) was a Major League Baseball left fielder. He later attended law school at Columbia University.

External links
Baseball Reference.com page

1855 births
1904 deaths
New York Mutuals players
Burials at Calvary Cemetery (Queens)
Major League Baseball left fielders
Baseball players from New York (state)
Brooklyn Chelsea players
Brooklyn Atlantics (minor league) players
New York Metropolitans (minor league) players
19th-century baseball players
Columbia Law School alumni